Traktor Minsk (Трактор) is a bandy club in Minsk, Belarus. It has provided players for the Belarus national bandy team.

References

Bandy clubs in Belarus
Bandy clubs established in 1947